The 2012 Women's South American Volleyball Club Championship was the fourth official edition of the women's volleyball tournament, played by four teams over  4–6 September 2012 in Osasco, Brazil. The winning team qualified for the 2012 FIVB Women's Club World Championship.

Competing clubs

Round-Robyn
The competition system for the tournament was a single Round-Robin system. Each team plays once against each of the 3 remaining teams. Points are accumulated during the whole tournament, and the final ranking is determined by the total points gained.

|}

Matches

|}

Final standing

Individual awards

Most Valuable Player
 Sheilla Castro (Sollys/Nestle)
Best Spiker
 Adenízia da Silva (Sollys/Nestle)
Best Blocker
 Thaisa Menezes (Sollys/Nestle)
Best Server
 Jaqueline Carvalho (Sollys/Nestle)

Best Digger
 Carolina Hartmann (Boca Juniors)
Best Setter
 Fabiola de Souza (Sollys/Nestle)
Best Receiver
 Fernanda Garay (Sollys/Nestle)
Best Libero
 Camila Brait (Sollys/Nestle)

References

Women's South American Volleyball Club Championship
Women's South American Volleyball Club Championship
Women's South American Volleyball Club Championship
International volleyball competitions hosted by Brazil